Jafarabad (also Romanized as Ja‘farābād) is a village in Abezhdan Rural District, Abezhdan District, Andika County, Khuzestan Province, Iran. At the 2006 census, its population was 1,021, in 196 families.

References 

Populated places in Andika County